Lovejoy Lake is a lake in Wadena County, in the U.S. state of Minnesota.

Lovejoy Lake bears the name of Charles O. Lovejoy, a pioneer who settled there.

See also
List of lakes in Minnesota

References

Lakes of Minnesota
Lakes of Wadena County, Minnesota